The Calgary Stampeders had an opportunity to defend their Grey Cup title in 1949, but the Montreal Alouettes returned the trophy to Quebec for just the third time in its history.

Canadian Football News in 1949
The Edmonton Eskimos rejoined with the WIFU and adopted the colours of gold and green. The WIFU regular season was extended to 14 games, per team.

Wearing helmets became compulsory with the two unions. The Western Canada Rugby Football Union ceased its operations.

Regular season

Final regular season standings
Note: GP = Games Played, W = Wins, L = Losses, T = Ties, PF = Points For, PA = Points Against, Pts = Points

Bold text means that they have clinched the playoffs.

Grey Cup playoffs
Note: All dates in 1949

Finals

 Calgary won the total-point series by 22–21. The Stampeders will advance to the Grey Cup game.

 Hamilton won the total-point series by 26–18. The Tigers will play the Montreal Alouettes in the Eastern finals.

 Montreal won the total-point series by 36–20. The Alouettes will play the Hamilton Tigers in the Eastern finals.

Eastern Finals

 The Montreal Alouettes will advance to the Grey Cup game.

Playoff bracket

Grey Cup Championship

1949 Eastern (Interprovincial Rugby Football Union) All-Stars
NOTE: During this time most players played both ways, so the All-Star selections do not distinguish between some offensive and defensive positions.

QB – Frank Filchock, Montreal Alouettes
QB – Andy Gordon, Ottawa Rough Riders
HB – Howie Turner, Ottawa Rough Riders
HB – Virgil Wagner, Montreal Alouettes
HB – Royal Copeland, Toronto Argonauts
E  – Robert Hood, Hamilton Wildcats
E  – Ralph Toohy, Montreal Alouettes
FW – Bob Paffrath, Ottawa Rough Riders
C  – Don Loney, Ottawa Rough Riders
G  – Eddie Michaels, Ottawa Rough Riders
G  – Vince Scott, Hamilton Wildcats
T  – Herb Trawick, Montreal Alouettes
T  – John Wagoner, Ottawa Rough Riders

1949 Western (Western Interprovincial Football Union) All-Stars
NOTE: During this time most players played both ways, so the All-Star selections do not distinguish between some offensive and defensive positions.

1st Team
QB – Keith Spaith, Calgary Stampeders
HB – Del Wardien, Saskatchewan Roughriders
HB – Ken Charlton, Saskatchewan Roughriders
HB – Vern Graham, Calgary Stampeders
FB – Sammy Pierce, Winnipeg Blue Bombers
E  – Ezzert Anderson, Calgary Stampeders
E  – Woody Strode, Calgary Stampeders
C  – Mel Wilson, Calgary Stampeders
G – Mike Kissell, Winnipeg Blue Bombers
G – Riley Matheson, Calgary Stampeders
T – Johnny Aguirre, Calgary Stampeders
T – Mike Cassidy, Saskatchewan Roughriders

2nd Team
QB – Doug Belden, Saskatchewan Roughriders
HB – Chuck Fenenbock, Edmonton Eskimos
HB – Normie Kwong, Calgary Stampeders
HB – Harry Hood, Calgary Stampeders
FB – Paul Rowe, Calgary Stampeders
E  – Matt Anthony, Saskatchewan Roughriders
E  – Johnny Bell, Saskatchewan Roughriders
C  – Doug Brightwell, Saskatchewan Roughriders
G – Bud Irving, Winnipeg Blue Bombers
G – Bert Iannone, Calgary Stampeders
T – Pat Santucci, Saskatchewan Roughriders
T – Toar Springstein, Saskatchewan Roughriders

1949 Ontario Rugby Football Union All-Stars
NOTE: During this time most players played both ways, so the All-Star selections do not distinguish between some offensive and defensive positions.

QB – Stan Wolkowski, Hamilton Tigers
HB – Don Knowles, Sarnia Imperials
HB – Jack Stewart, Hamilton Tigers
DB – Sylvester Mike, Windsor Rockets
E  – Keith Fisher, Sarnia Imperials
E  – Bill Damiano, Hamilton Tigers
E  – Rube Ainsworth, Hamilton Tigers
FW – Joe Capriotti, Hamilton Tigers
C  – Jake Gaudaur, Hamilton Tigers
G  – Don McKenzie, Toronto Beaches-Indians
G  – Jack Moreau, Windsor Rockets
T  – Lloyd "Dutch" Davey, Sarnia Imperials
T  – Len Wright, Windsor Rockets

1949 Canadian Football Awards
 Jeff Russel Memorial Trophy (IRFU MVP) – Royal Copeland (RB), Toronto Argonauts
 Jeff Nicklin Memorial Trophy (WIFU MVP) - Keith Spaith (QB), Calgary Stampeders
 Gruen Trophy (IRFU Rookie of the Year) - Jim Loreno (HB), Hamilton Wildcats
 Dr. Beattie Martin Trophy (WIFU Rookie of the Year) - John Stroppa (HB), Winnipeg Blue Bombers
 Imperial Oil Trophy (ORFU MVP) - Don Knowles - Sarnia Imperials

References

 
Canadian Football League seasons